HD 118508 is a variable star in the northern constellation of Boötes. It varies marginally in luminosity with an amplitude of 0.04 in magnitude.

References

External links
 HR 5123
 Image HD 118508

Boötes
118508
066417
M-type giants
5123
Suspected variables
Durchmusterung objects